David Owino (born 20 July 1998) is a Kenyan football defender who played for Kenya Commercial Bank.

References

1998 births
Living people
Kenyan footballers
Kenya international footballers
Mathare United F.C. players
Kenya Commercial Bank S.C. players
Association football defenders
People from Kiambu County